Steacyite is a complex silicate mineral containing thorium and uranium; formula . It forms small brown or yellow green crystals, often cruciform twinned crystals.  It is radioactive. It was discovered at Mont-Saint-Hilaire, Quebec in 1982 and is named after Harold Robert Steacy (1923–2012), mineralogist.

References
Notes

Sources
 Handbook of Mineralogy
 mindat page for steacyite

See also
List of minerals
List of minerals named after people

Calcium minerals
Thorium minerals
Uranium minerals
Cyclosilicates
Tetragonal minerals
Minerals in space group 124